The Turkey women's national volleyball team is formed by the Turkish Volleyball Federation (TVF) and represents Turkey in international CEV and FIVB organizations.

The team is one of the most successful national sports teams in the country and is nicknamed "Filenin Sultanları" since the 2003 Women's European Volleyball Championship hosted in Ankara, Turkey. It is ranked sixth in the FIVB World Rankings as of October, 2022. It was the bronze medallist in both 2011 Women's European Volleyball Championship and 2012 FIVB World Grand Prix. Daniele Santarelli is the new head coach of the team.

History
Sabiha Gürayman was the first Turkish woman to engage in the game of volleyball, which was introduced in Turkey in the 1910s. As a young woman Gürayman founded and played for the Fenerbahçe women's volleyball team, having previously played in the men's team of that club. Turkish women volleyball has undergone a rapid transformation since the 2000s, achieving many successes at both club and national level. As a result, women's volleyball is one of the best followed sports in Turkey.

Achievements

Olympic Games

World Championship

FIVB World Cup

World Grand Prix

Nations League

Mediterranean Games

European Championship

European Games

European League

Montreux Volley Masters

Team

Current squad
The following was the Turkish team in the 2022 Volleyball Nations League.

Head coach:  Daniele Santarelli

Former squads
2003 European Championship — Silver Medal
Bahar Mert, Esra Gümüş, Sinem Akap, Özlem Özçelik, Aysun Özbek, Natalia Hanikoğlu, Mesude Kuyan, Pelin Çelik, Çiğdem Can, Gülden Kayalar, Seda Tokatlıoğlu and Neslihan Darnel. Head coach:  Reşat Yazıcıoğulları.
2009 European League — Silver Medal
İpek Soroğlu, Pelin Çelik, Neslihan Darnel, Nihan Yeldan, Seda Tokatlıoğlu, Deniz Hakyemez, Naz Aydemir, Esra Gümüş, Eda Erdem, Duygu Bal, Gözde Kırdar and Gülden Kayalar  Head coach:  Alessandro Chiappini.
2011 European Championship — Bronze Medal
Asuman Karakoyun, Gözde Kırdar Sonsırma, Gizem Güreşen, Elif Onur, Ergül Avcı, Polen Uslupehlivan, Bahar Toksoy, Güldeniz Önal, Naz Aydemir, Esra Gümüş, Neriman Özsoy, Eda Erdem, Neşve Büyükbayram, Selime İlyasoğlu, Neslihan Darnel, Özge Kırdar Çemberci and Ceren Kestirengöz. Head coach:  Marco Aurelio Motta.
2012 FIVB World Grand Prix — Bronze Medal
Gülden Kayalar Kuzubaşıoğlu, Gözde Kırdar Sonsırma, Gizem Güreşen, Ergül Avcı, Bahar Toksoy, Güldeniz Önal, Naz Aydemir, Esra Gümüş, Neriman Özsoy, Eda Erdem, Neslihan Darnel and Nilay Özdemir. Head coach:  Marco Aurelio Motta.
2014 European League — Gold Medal
Ezgi Dilik, Kübra Akman, Ceylan Arısan, Bihter Dumanoğlu, Polen Uslupehlivan, Yeliz Başa, Hatice Gizem Örge, Cansu Çetin, Gözde Yılmaz, Meliha İsmailoğlu, Çağla Akın and Özgenur Yurtdagülen. Head coach:  Ferhat Akbaş.
2015 Montreux Volley Masters — Gold Medal
Seniye Merve Dalbeler, Gizem Karadayı, Dicle Nur Babat, Kübra Akman, Polen Uslupehlivan, Seda Aslanyürek, Büşra Cansu, Güldeniz Önal Paşalıoğlu (C), Naz Aydemir Akyol, Neriman Özsoy, Gözde Yılmaz, Meliha İsmailoğlu, Aslı Kalaç, Çağla Akın and Ezgi Dağdelenler. Head coach:  Ferhat Akbaş.
2015 European Games — Gold Medal
Seniye Merve Dalbeler, Gizem Karadayı, Dicle Nur Babat, Kübra Akman, Polen Uslupehlivan, Seda Aslanyürek, Büşra Cansu, Güldeniz Önal Paşalıoğlu (C), Naz Aydemir Akyol, Neriman Özsoy, Gözde Yılmaz, Meliha İsmailoğlu, Aslı Kalaç and Çağla Akın. Head coach:  Ferhat Akbaş.
2015 European League — Silver Medal
Melike Yılmaz, Birgül Güler, Buse Kayacan, Fatma Yıldırım, Ceren Kestirengöz, Ezgi Dilik, Ezgi Dağdelenler, Meryem Boz, Ayşe Melis Gürkaynak, Damla Çakıroğlu, Cansu Aydunoğulları, Serpil Ersarı. Head coach:  Ismail Yengil.

See also
 Women's
Turkey Women's national volleyball team U23
Turkey Women's national volleyball team U20
Turkey Women's national volleyball team U18
 Men's
Turkey Men's national volleyball team
Turkey Men's national volleyball team U23
Turkey Men's national volleyball team U21
Turkey Men's national volleyball team U19

References

External links
Official website
FIVB profile
CEV profile

Turkey Women
National team
V